The Women's Heptathlon at the 2000 Summer Olympics as part of the athletics program was held at the Stadium Australia on Wednesday 23 September and Thursday 24 September.

Medalists

Both Lewis and Sazanovich had won medals (bronze and silver respectively) at the previous Olympics in 1996. Prokhorova would go on to win the 2001 World Championships. At the next Olympic Games in 2004, Prokhorova finished fifth while Lewis did not finish because of injury.

Records
These were the standing world and Olympic records (in points) prior to the 2000 Summer Olympics.

Results

Overall results
Points table after 7th event:

References

External links
 IAAF results day one: 100 m hurdles, high jump, shot put and 200 m. Retrieved 17 February 2007.
 IAAF results day two: long jump, javelin and 800 m. Retrieved 17 February 2007.
IAAF results: Final standings. Retrieved 17 February 2007.

Official Report of the 2000 Sydney Summer Olympics

Heptathlon
2000
2000 in women's athletics
Women's events at the 2000 Summer Olympics